Froxfield may refer to several places in England:
Froxfield, a civil parish in Wiltshire
Froxfield Bottom Lock
Froxfield Middle Lock
Froxfield, Bedfordshire, a hamlet
Froxfield, Hampshire, a hamlet
Froxfield and Privett, a civil parish in Hampshire

See also 
 Froxfield Green, a village in Hampshire